The term Albanian Catholic Church can refer to:

 Catholic Church in Albania, incorporating all communities and institutions of the Catholic Church in Albania
 Albanian Greek Catholic Church or Albanian Byzantine Catholic Church, an Eastern Catholic church of the Byzantine Rite in Albania
 Italo-Albanian Catholic Church, an Eastern Catholic church of Byzantine-rite Italo-Albanians in Italy

See also 
 Apostolic Administration of Southern Albania
 Belarusian Catholic Church
 Bulgarian Catholic Church
 Croatian Catholic Church
 Greek Catholic Church
 Hungarian Catholic Church
 Romanian Catholic Church
 Russian Catholic Church
 Serbian Catholic Church
 Slovak Catholic Church
 Ukrainian Catholic Church